Brigadier Saurabh Singh Shekhawat, KC, SC, SM, VSM is an Indian Army officer of the 21 Para (SF) and an avid mountaineer. He is one of Indian Army's most decorated officers, with one war-time gallantry award and two peace-time gallantry awards to his name.

Early life 
Shekhawat was born in a Hindu Rajput Family on 18 October 1970 in Alwar, Rajasthan. His Father's name is J.S. Shekhawat and his mother's name is Sreddha.

Career
Military career

Shekhawat was commissioned in the Indian Army as a Second Lieutenant from  Indian Military Academy , Dehradun on 11 June 1994 and was promoted lieutenant on 11 June 1996 and captain on 11 June 1999 and major on 11 June 2004. He was promoted lieutenant-colonel on 11 June 2007 and to colonel on 6 January 2010 (seniority from 1 January). He was promoted to the rank of Brigadier in March 2020.

Mountaineering Career

Shekhawat has ascended Mount Everest three times in 2001, 2003 and 2005. He has also climbed Kilimanjaro, the highest peak in Africa, and Mont Blanc, the highest peak in the Alps and Western Europe. In October 2009 he led the joint Indo-Kazakh team to scale the Kazakhstan peak of Marble Wall peak in Kazakhstan  He has climbed 14 peaks in the world till date.
On 23 June 2022, a 55 men Indian Army expedition team, led by Shekhawat, successfully scaled the climb to Shahi Kangri.

Controversies

Victimization claim 
In 2017, Shekhawat filed a complaint to the Ministry of Defence accusing two former army chiefs, Gen. Bikram Singh and Gen. Dalbir Singh, and a senior serving officer, Lt. Gen. Abhay Krishna of victimizing him. Shekhawat claimed he was denied promotion because of lackluster reviews in annual confidential reports given to him as retaliation. Shekhawat claimed the trigger for the victimization was his report made officially to the Army about a dacoity in Jorhat of a private citizen's residence involving personnel of the 3 Corps Counter Intelligence and Surveillance Unit in December 2011. At the time of the robbery, Gen. Dalbir Singh was then Corps Commander of 3 Corps and Lt. Gen. Abhay Krishna was then Shekhawat's brigadier general staff (operations). Shekhawat claimed Krihsna acted on Gen. Dalbir Singh's behalf to give him poor performance reviews. When Gen. Bikram Singh became Army Chief, the Discipline and Vigilance Ban imposed on Gen. Dalbir Singh by the previous Army Chief for inaction over the robbery was lifted and Gen. Dalbir Singh was further promoted.

Shekhawat also alleged that Gen. Dalbir Singh tried to harm his career by preventing him from taking the Higher Command Course, a qualification for promotion. But since the weightage for the course selection took into account medals and field service, he qualified for the course to the alleged chagrin of Gen. Dalbir Singh. Shekhawat speculated that Gen. Dalbir Singh in reaction was able to get weightage of medals and field service removed from consideration for higher command courses from 2014 onwards.

Dispute with The Week 
On 14 March 2020, the current affairs magazine The Week published a story on Shekhawat titled ‘ decorated Colonel Saurabh Singh Shekhawat promoted after years of wait’ regarding the claims by Shekhawat of victimization at the hands of senior officers. Shekhawat in response wrote a letter to The Week claiming the story was inaccurate and said such stories "hurt the sentiment" of soldiers who serve and create doubts in the minds of the general public about the Army. The reporter Pradip R. Sagar provided a rebuttal by pointing out the story was not meant to "cast aspersions" on the Army but highlight accusations made against top Army brass.

Awards

Shekhawat has been awarded the Kirti Chakra, the Shaurya Chakra, Sena Medal (Gallantry), Vishisht Seva Medal and the Samanya Seva Medal amongst other medals for anti-terrorist operations, mountaineering and distinguished service. Shekhawat in a letter to Army headquarters in 2017 referred to himself as the "highest decorated serving officer in the army with an unblemished operational profile."

Personal life 
Shekhawat is married to Renuka Shekhawat, a professor of Sanskrit at Rajasthan University.

See also
Indian summiters of Mount Everest - Year wise
List of Mount Everest summiters by number of times to the summit
List of Mount Everest records of India
List of Mount Everest records

References

Living people
Indian Army officers
People from Alwar
Rajasthani people
Indian mountain climbers
Para Commandos
Indian summiters of Mount Everest
Military personnel from Rajasthan
Recipients of the Shaurya Chakra
Recipients of the Kirti Chakra
1971 births
Recipients of the Sena Medal
Recipients of the Vishisht Seva Medal